Des Rocs is an American rock artist from New York, New York. Des Rocs is a solo project produced and led by New York native Daniel Rocco. When touring Rocco is joined by his long time friends and bandmates, William Tully and Eric Mendelsohn.

Des Rocs has toured with rock bands such as Muse, The Rolling Stones, and The Struts. Influences for Rocco include Muse, Elvis Presley, Jimi Hendrix, Roy Orbison, Kanye West, and Queen, though Rocco's focus is individuality and sounding unlike other rock artists.

History

Origins and EPs (2018–2020) 

Rocco began performing in bars and basements from as early as 13 years old. Before starting Des Rocs, he had performed in the band Secret Weapons, which had opened for bands such as Panic! at the Disco, Fall Out Boy, and Weezer. Secret Weapons eventually went on permanent hiatus after bandmate Gerry Lang's health deteriorated with Lyme disease. He released his first EP, Let The Vultures In, in November 2018.

Alive tour and A Real Good Person In A Real Bad Place (2021) 
In the spring of 2021, Des Rocs announced the Alive tour, and a virtual livestream concert (also called the "Des Rocs Alive Virtual Concert"). During the live dates of the tour, rock band The Velveteers accompanied the tour as the opening band. Kicking off in the Fall of 2021, the tour spanned 20+ cities across the United States, ending in the New York City's Bowery Ballroom. During the virtual concert, which was the first live playthrough of This is Our Life, Des Rocs culminated with the track "Tick" from his then yet-to-be-announced album. The track's lyrics also hinted at the title of the new album, A Real Good Person In A Real Bad Place.

The album title and tracklist was announced on July 30, 2021, coinciding with the release of the album's first single, "MMC" (Mickey Mouse Club). Des Rocs released two more singles before the album's debut: "Imaginary Friends" and "Hanging by a Thread".

Once In A Lifetime tour and Manic Memories (2022) 
In the spring of 2022, the Once In A Lifetime tour was announced, co-headlining with Canadian rock band The Blue Stones. The tour spanned over 20 cities in the continental United States, beginning in Milwaukee, WI and ending in Columbus, OH. Openers for the tour included Clay Melton and First In Flight. Des Rocs headlining shows were announced after the initial tour announcement in Salt Lake City, UT and Portland, OR, without The Blue Stones, and for the last 3 dates of the tour (St. Louis, MO; Nashville, TN; and Columbus, OH). The Blue Stones canceled their sets, leaving Des Rocs as the sole headliner. 

Des Rocs will be supporting Badflower on their "Asking For A Friend" tour, alongside Blood Red Shoes.  They debuted a new song that has not yet been announced or released, "Never Ending Moment", during this tour.

Discography

Studio albums

EPs

Singles

Music Videos

References

External links
 Official website

American rock musicians